Kamstra is a Dutch surname. Notable people with the surname include:

Berber Kamstra (born 1960), Dutch swimmer
Brian Kamstra (born 1993), Dutch cyclist
Joop Kamstra (1905–1957), Dutch athlete
Petra Kamstra (born 1974), Dutch tennis player

Dutch-language surnames